Grigoriy Abramovich Zhelyeznogorskiy (Ukrainian - Григо́рій Абра́мович Желєзного́рський ; born Gersh Abramovich Eisenberg; 1896, Tarashcha, Kiev Governorate - 22 September 1938, Kiev) was a lawyer of the Ukrainian Soviet Socialist Republic, acting as its final Prosecutor General in spring 1936 before Ukraine's public prosecutor's office was subordinated to the Prosecutor General of the Soviet Union the following year.

Sources

1896 births
1938 deaths
People from Tarashcha
People from Kiev Governorate
Prosecutors of the Ukrainian Soviet Socialist Republic
Ukrainian Trotskyists
Great Purge victims from Ukraine
Ukrainian Socialist-Revolutionary Party politicians
Communist Party of Ukraine (Soviet Union) politicians
Judges of the Supreme Court of Ukraine
Ukrainian Jews
Jews executed by the Soviet Union
Jewish socialists